Statistics of Liberian Premier League in season 1995.

Overview
Mighty Barrolle won the championship.

References
Liberia - List of final tables (RSSSF)

Football competitions in Liberia
Lea